Knife is the second album by Scottish indie pop group Aztec Camera, released on 21 September 1984. It reached number 14 on the UK Albums Chart – their highest showing at that time. It also charted at No. 29 on the Swedish Albums Chart.

The original release did not include the acoustic cover of "Jump" by Van Halen; this was added after Aztec Camera's version (originally the B-side of "All I Need Is Everything") gained popularity.

Track listing

Side A
"Still on Fire" – 3:56
"Just Like the USA" – 4:03
"Head Is Happy (Heart's Insane)" – 4:16
"The Back Door to Heaven" – 5:22
Side B
"All I Need Is Everything" – 5:44
"Backwards and Forwards" – 4:13
"The Birth of the True" – 2:42
"Knife" – 9:05
All songs written by Roddy Frame

Personnel
 Roddy Frame – vocals, guitar
 David Ruffy – drums, backing vocals
 Campbell Owens – bass, backing vocals
 Malcolm Ross – guitar, backing vocals
 Guy Fletcher – keyboards, backing vocals
 Frank Ricotti – percussion
 Chris White – saxophone
 Martin Drover – trumpet

References 

1984 albums
Aztec Camera albums
Albums produced by Mark Knopfler
Sire Records albums